Steven Reed Konowalchuk (born November 11, 1972) is an American former professional ice hockey left winger who played in the NHL with the Washington Capitals and the Colorado Avalanche. He is currently the head coach of the WHL's Red Deer Rebels. Konowalchuk is the first player born and raised in Utah to make it to the NHL level.

Playing career
He was drafted by the Washington Capitals in the 1991 NHL Entry Draft, 3rd Round, 58th overall from the Portland Winterhawks of the Western Hockey League.  During the 2001–02 NHL season he served as co-captain of the Capitals alongside teammate Brendan Witt. In October 2002 it was announced that he would serve as the tenth full-time captain of the Capitals. He would hold the position until he was traded to Colorado by Washington with Washington's third selection in the 2004 NHL Entry Draft in exchange for Bates Battaglia and the rights to Jonas Johansson on October 22, 2003. On September 29, 2006, Konowalchuk announced his retirement after a regular examination detected Long QT syndrome.

Coaching career
After his retirement, Konowalchuk remained within the Avalanche organization and served as an assistant coach to Joe Sacco during the 2009–10 and 2010–11 season. In June 2011, he was named head coach of the Seattle Thunderbirds of the Western Hockey League. He led the team to a WHL championship in the 2016–17 season.

In June 2017, Konowalchuk left the Seattle Thunderbirds to join the NHL's Anaheim Ducks as an assistant coach.

Konowalchuk was fired from the Ducks after just one season. In September 2018, he was hired by the NHL's New York Rangers as an amateur scout, mainly focused on prospects in the Western Hockey League.

On June 8, 2021, the Red Deer Rebels announced that Konowalchuk would take over from owner & general manager, Brent Sutter as head coach of the hockey club.

Career statistics

Regular season and playoffs

International

Coaching record

Awards
 WHL West First All-Star Team – 1992

References

External links

1972 births
Living people
American men's ice hockey left wingers
American people of Ukrainian descent
Anaheim Ducks coaches
Baltimore Skipjacks players
Colorado Avalanche coaches
Colorado Avalanche players
Ice hockey people from Utah
Portland Pirates players
Portland Winterhawks players
Seattle Thunderbirds coaches
Sportspeople from Salt Lake City
Washington Capitals captains
Washington Capitals draft picks
Washington Capitals players